Jai Mahabharat is an Indian mythological television series that aired on Zee TV from 26 October 2001 to 26 July 2002. It used to air every Friday night at 10 P.M.

Cast 
 Siraj Mustafa Khan as Krishna
 Sunil Mattoo as Yudhishthira
 Raj Premi as Bhima
 Manish Khanna as Arjuna
 Sunil Singh as Bhishma
 Bhupendra Singh as Karna
 Vinod Kapoor as Dronacharya
 Mahendra Ghule as Jarasandh
 Nimai Bali as Duryodhan
 Lalit Tiwari as Dhritarashtra
 Ranu Hashia as Pandu
 Rohitash Gaud as Vidur
 Lata Sabharwal as Kunti
 Mandira Bedi as Draupadi
 Neha Joshi as Ganga
 Ashish Kapoor as Abhimanyu
 Amit Pachori as Ashwatthama
 Anwar Fatehan as Shakuni
 Swati Anand as Satyavati
 Jitendra Trehan as Shantanu
 Tarakesh Chauhan as Ved Vyasa
 Manish Sharma as Sahadeva of Magadha
 Shalini Kapoor Sagar as Ambika
 Malini Kapoor as Ambalika
 Utkarsha Naik as Vinita
 Sonia Rakkar as Subhadra

References

External links 

 Jai Mahabharat on IMDb

Indian television series about Hindu deities
2001 Indian television series debuts
2002 Indian television series endings
Zee TV original programming